Cheshin may refer to:
Mishael Cheshin (1936–2015), Israeli judge
Cheshin, Iran (disambiguation), places in Iran